Steve or Stephen Holt may refer to:

Steve Holt (American musician), guitarist for the band 36 Crazyfists
Steve Holt (Canadian musician) (born 1954), Canadian jazz pianist
Stephen Holt (field hockey) (born 1974), defender and midfielder from Australia
Stephen Holt (basketball) (born 1991), Filipino-American 
Stephen Holt, vocalist for the British band Inspiral Carpets
Stephen Holt, pen name of writer Harlan Howard Thompson (1894–1987)
Steve Holt (Arrested Development), fictional character on the TV series Arrested Development